Imogen Mary Thomas (born 29 November 1982) is a Welsh model and television personality. She won the Miss Wales award in 2003, and appeared on the seventh series of Channel 4 reality television programme Big Brother in 2006. In 2011, her alleged extramarital relationship with footballer Ryan Giggs was the subject of a gagging order in England and Wales.

Early life
Imogen Mary Thomas was born 29 November 1982 in Llanelli, Wales. She started working as a model at age 13, and at the age of 17 moved to London to become a professional model. Working in bars to pay for her living costs, she was rejected by many modelling agencies due to her height (5ft 6").

She was crowned Miss Wales in 2003, beating future Big Brother 9 winner Rachel Rice, who came third. She went on to represent Wales at Miss World in China. This prompted her to return to London to try glamour modelling, and also working as a bar hostess at London's Sanderson Hotel.

Big Brother and modelling
In 2006, Thomas was selected as a housemate for the seventh series of Big Brother. She was evicted on Day 86 with 62% of the public vote. Since her time on Big Brother, Thomas has become a glamour model.

Television work
Like other contestants, Thomas has taken part in many Big Brother spin-off programmes, including Big Brother's Little Brother and Big Brother's Big Mouth. She also co-presented with other housemates for T4.

Other work 
Imogen appeared on the S4C Planed Plant ghost hunting show Ofn, filmed at Chirk Castle alongside fellow Big Brother contestant Glyn Wise. She also portrayed herself in a cameo performance on the S4C soap opera Pobol y Cwm.

See also
 2011 British privacy injunctions controversy

References

External links
 
 

Living people
People from Swansea
People from Llanelli
People educated at Ysgol y Strade
Alumni of the University of Worcester
Welsh female models
Big Brother (British TV series) contestants
Association footballers' wives and girlfriends
Miss World 2003 delegates
1982 births